Victor Francis Yates (19 April 1900 – 19 January 1969) was a British pacifist Labour Party politician.

He was the Member of Parliament (MP) for Birmingham, Ladywood from the July 1945 general election, when he beat the Unionist incumbent, until his death in January 1969 at the age of 68. He had had a heart attack in the House of Commons in the preceding October. In the subsequent by-election the seat was gained by the Liberal candidate Wallace Lawler.

At Yates's cremation, his pallbearers were Roy Hattersley, Denis Howell, Roy Jenkins and Brian Walden.

The National Portrait Gallery holds a number of photographic portraits of him, including several by Walter Stoneman.

The Victor Yates Care Home in Ladywood is named in his honour.

References

External links
 
 remeniscences of Yates from Old Ladywood (includes pictures)

1900 births
1969 deaths
Association of Professional, Executive, Clerical and Computer Staff-sponsored MPs
Labour Party (UK) MPs for English constituencies
UK MPs 1945–1950
UK MPs 1950–1951
UK MPs 1951–1955
UK MPs 1955–1959
UK MPs 1959–1964
UK MPs 1964–1966
UK MPs 1966–1970
British pacifists
History of Birmingham, West Midlands
Ladywood